Talos was a giant bronze automaton in Greek mythology. For other uses in mythology, see Talos (mythology).

Talos may also refer to:

In fiction
The Talos Principle, a first-person puzzle video game
Talos, one of the Nine Divines from The Elder Scrolls video game series
Tale of the Mummy, a 1998 horror film also known as Talos the Mummy
Talos the Untamed, a character who has opposed the Hulk and other Marvel Comics characters
Talos (Forgotten Realms), a god in the Forgotten Realms campaign setting for the game Dungeons & Dragons
Talos (Freedom City), a supervillain in the Freedom City setting for the game Mutants & Masterminds
Talos IV, a planet in the Star Trek episode "The Cage"
Dora Talos, a mecha in the Japanese animated series Kyōryū Sentai Zyuranger
T-ALOS, Tyrant Armored Lethal Organic System, a fictional bio-organic weapon featured in the video game Resident Evil: The Umbrella Chronicles
A minor character in the Space 1999 episode "The Last Enemy"
Talos 1, the space station which forms the setting of the 2017 game Prey

Other uses
RIM-8 Talos, a U.S. Navy surface-to-air missile
TalOS, an operating system
Talos (dinosaur), from the Late Cretaceous
Talos Dome, an ice dome in East Antarctica
Talos (inventor), a mythological Greek inventor
Talos (musician), Irish musician
Talos Records
TALOS (uniform), Tactical Assault Light Operator Suit, a US military exoskeleton